Douglas County High School, sometimes nicknamed as DCHS and locally identified as DC, is a public high school in Castle Rock, Colorado. It is the oldest school in the Douglas County School District.

History

Elementary through high school classes were held in the Cantril School building in Castle Rock from 1897 through 1907.  Douglas County High School was built in the 600 block of Wilcox Street in 1907. The brick building burned down in a 1909 fire and was replaced with a rhyolite building. On May 28, 1937, the building was damaged by a tornado. It was repaired and sees use as a school to this day.
 
Groundbreaking at the school's current location on Front Street occurred in 1961. The new school location opened in 1967, and fourth through sixth grade students attended classes at the former high school location until Castle Rock Elementary was built in 1983.

Students
Demographics:
28:1 student-to-staff ratio
4% of students are eligible for free lunch
2.9% of students are ethnic minorities

Extracurricular activities

Sports
Douglas County High School teams compete in the 5A class sanctioned by the Colorado High School Activities Association. Teams fielded by the school include baseball, basketball, cross country, football, golf, gymnastics, lacrosse, soccer, softball, swimming, tennis, track, volleyball and wrestling. Rugby is offered through a cooperative agreement with Castle View High School through a club team named the Castle Rock Pirates.  Ice hockey and inline hockey teams are fielded at the club level.

State championship titles 
1972: AA Boys' Track and Field
1992: 1A-5A Softball
1994: 4A Softball
2005: 5A Football
2007: 5A Inline Hockey
2007: 4A-5A Co-Ed Cheerleading
2008: 5A Boys' Golf
2008: 4A-5A Co-Ed Cheerleading
2009: 5A Boys' Golf Champions
2009: 4A-5A Co-Ed Cheerleading
2010: 4A-5A Co-Ed Cheerleading
2011: 4A-5A Co-Ed Cheerleading
2021: 5A Cheer
2021: 5A Boys' Volleyball

Band
The Douglas County High School Marching Band won the state CBA Marching Band Championship in 1995.

Curriculum
Douglas County High School adopted the International Baccalaureate program in 1996. It serves a magnet program within the district.  Douglas County High School is one of few IB schools in the world that offers all four sixth subjects of Art, Music, Dance, and Theatre.

Notable alumni

 Amy Adams (class of 1992), actress
 Kirsten Bomblies - MacArthur Fellow and biology professor at Harvard University
 Kat Cammack - United States Representative for Florida's 3rd Congressional District
 Jimmy Cottrell - former NFL linebacker with the Baltimore Ravens
 Aaryn Gries - contestant on Big Brother 15
 Beth Malone - actress
 Dave B. Mitchell - VO actor (DCHS Class of '87)
 Taylor Ritzel - member of the 2012 US women's rowing Olympic team

References

External links

Public high schools in Colorado
Schools in Douglas County, Colorado
Educational institutions established in 1897
International Baccalaureate schools in Colorado
1897 establishments in Colorado